Penstemon speciosus is a species of penstemon known by the common name royal penstemon of western North America.

Distribution
Native to the western United States, it is most common east of the crest of the Cascade Range of Washington and Oregon; southern Idaho; mountainous California from the Klamath Ranges along the High Sierra Nevada to the Western Transverse Ranges, San Gabriel and San Bernardino Mountains; and scattered through the mountains of northern Nevada. It is associated with diverse habitats, from sagebrush scrub, plateau and foothill scrub to subalpine mountain forests.

Description
It is a perennial herb growing erect to a maximum height near . They are arranged oppositely and often clasp the stem at the bases. The flowers are light to deep blue, lavender, and purple, and usually have white throats. The white, generally hairless, throat helps to distinguish it from similar species within its range.

References

External links

CalPhotos gallery

speciosus
Flora of the Western United States
Flora without expected TNC conservation status